John Allen is a New Zealand public servant. From 2009 to 2014 he served as chief executive of the New Zealand Ministry of Foreign Affairs and Trade. He was the acting Administrator of Tokelau from 2009 until 2011.

Allen had previous worked as chief executive of NZ Post. In April 2009 he was appointed chief executive of the New Zealand Ministry of Foreign Affairs and Trade, becoming the first non-diplomat to lead MFAT. His tenure was controversial, with restructuring plans resulting in widespread opposition from staff, and in leaks of MFAT cables to the opposition. In 2014 he was forced to apologise to rape victim Tania Billingsley over his handling of the 2014 Malaysian diplomat indecent assault case. He resigned from the role in November 2014 to take up a role with the New Zealand Racing Board. He was replaced as chief executive by Brook Barrington.

In September 2019 he resigned from the racing board. In 2020 he was appointed chief executive of WellingtonNZ. In October 2021 he was elected chancellor of Victoria University of Wellington.

References

Living people
Administrators of Tokelau
New Zealand diplomats
New Zealand public servants
Year of birth missing (living people)
Place of birth missing (living people)
Chancellors of the Victoria University of Wellington